Rugolomania is an album by composer, arranger and conductor Pete Rugolo, featuring performances recorded in 1954 and 1955 and released on the Columbia label.

Reception

The AllMusic review by Scott Yanow noted: "The third of three Pete Rugolo Columbia LPs has some of the finest and most interesting work of the arranger's career. ... Brilliant and highly original music."

Track listing
All compositions by Pete Rugolo, except where indicated.
 "Gone with the Wind" (Allie Wrubel, Herb Magidson) - 2:36
 "In a Sentimental Mood" (Duke Ellington, Manny Kurtz, Irving Mills) - 3:28
 "Bobbin' with Bob" - 2:53
 "4:20 A. M." (David Rose) - 2:36
 "Little White Lies" (Walter Donaldson) - 3:15
 "Me Next!" - 3:00
 "Bongo Dance" (Traditional) - 3:21
 "Intermezzo (A Love Story)" (Heinz Provost) - 3:48
 "Montevideo" (Hal Schaefer) - 2:58
 "I've Had My Moments" (Donaldson, Gus Kahn) - 2:51
 "Everything I Have Is Yours" (Burton Lane, Harold Adamson) - 3:07
 "Hornorama" (Julius Watkins) - 3:25
Recorded in Los Angeles, CA on May 10, 1954 (track 4), in New York City on November 11, 1955 (tracks 1, 11 & 12) and in Los Angeles, CA on February 11, 1955 (tracks 2, 3 & 5-10).

Personnel
Pete Rugolo - arranger, conductor
Pete Candoli (track 4), Buddy Childers (tracks 3, 5 & 7), Larry Fain (tracks 1, 11 & 12), Maynard Ferguson (tracks 3-5 & 7), Conrad Gozzo (track 4) Leon Meriam (tracks 1, 11 & 12), Doug Mettome (tracks 1, 11 & 12), Uan Rasey (tracks 3, 5 & 7), Shorty Rogers (track 3-5 & 7), John Wilson (tracks 1, 11 & 12) - trumpet 
Milt Bernhart (tracks 2-10), Eddie Bert (tracks 1, 11 & 12), Harry Betts (tracks 3-5 & 7), Bob Fitzpatrick (tracks 3, 5 & 7), Milt Gold (tracks 1, 11 & 12), John Halliburton (track 4), Herbie Harper (tracks 3, 5 & 7), Frank Rehak (tracks 1, 11 & 12), Kai Winding (tracks 1, 11 & 12) - trombone
George Roberts - bass trombone (track 4)
John Cave (track 4), Vincent DeRosa (tracks 3, 5 & 7), John Graas (tracks 2-10), Sinclair Loot (track 4), Stan Paley (tracks 1, 11 & 12), Julius Watkins  (tracks 1, 11 & 12) - French horn
Bill Barber (tracks 1, 11 & 12), Paul Sarmento (tracks 2-10) - tuba
Bud Shank - alto saxophone, alto flute (tracks 2-10)
Chase Dean (tracks 1, 11 & 12), Harry Klee (tracks 3-5 & 7), Dave Schildkraut (tracks 1, 11 & 12) - alto saxophone
Bob Cooper - tenor saxophone, oboe (tracks 2-10)
Jimmy Giuffre (tracks 3-5 & 7), Joe Megro (tracks 1, 11 & 12) - tenor saxophone, baritone saxophone
Herbie Mann (tracks 1, 11 & 12) - flute, tenor saxophone
Bob Gordon (tracks 3-5 & 7), Marty Flax (tracks 1, 11 & 12) - baritone saxophone
Gordon ell (tracks 1, 11 & 12), Russ Freeman (tracks 3, 5 & 7), Claude Williamson (track 4) - piano
Perry Lopez (tracks 1, 11 & 12). Howard Roberts (tracks 2-10) - guitar
Harry Babasin (track 2-10), Whitey Mitchell (tracks 1, 11 & 12) - bass
Shelly Manne - drums (tracks 2-10)
Jack Costanzo (track 7) - bongos
Bernie Mattison (tracks 3-5 & 7), Teddy Sommer (tracks 1, 11 & 12), Jerry Segal (tracks 1, 11 & 12) - percussion

References

1955 albums
Pete Rugolo albums
Columbia Records albums
Albums arranged by Pete Rugolo
Albums conducted by Pete Rugolo